

Season 
After another disappointing season, Inter retained Giovanni Trapattoni and acquired German footballers: Brehme, a fullback, and Lothar Matthäus, a box-to-box midfielder, signed for the club. For the role of centre-forward, the first choice was Rabah Madjer: when he met physical issues, however, he was replaced by Ramón Díaz. The attacking couple, completed by Aldo Serena, proved to be very regular in scoring. The departure of Alessandro Altobelli was not critical, despite an early elimination from the Coppa Italia.

The domestic league had an easier path, with Inter able to stay unbeaten for almost half of the season; but were knocked out of Europe, caused by Bayern Munich. Fiorentina were the first to beat Inter, on matchday 17. The following positive streak made the gap over rivals so large that Inter could celebrate the Scudetto on 28 May, after beating Napoli 2–1. During the last month, with five games to spare, the side had collected 26 wins, six draws and two losses: the final amount was 58 points, a still-unbeaten record for Serie A with 18 teams and two points for a win.

Squad

Goalkeepers
  Walter Zenga
  Astutillo Malgioglio

Defenders
  Giuseppe Bergomi
  Giuseppe Baresi
  Andreas Brehme
  Riccardo Ferri
  Andrea Mandorlini
  Corrado Verdelli
  Romano Galvani
  Salvatore Nobile

Midfielders
  Lothar Matthäus
  Alessandro Bianchi
  Nicola Berti
  Gianfranco Matteoli
  Alberto Rivolta
  Pietro Fanna

Attackers
  Aldo Serena
  Dario Morello
  Massimo Ciocci
  Ramón Díaz

Competitions

Serie A

League table

Results by round

Matches

Top Scorers
  Aldo Serena 22
  Ramón Díaz 12
  Lothar Matthäus 9
  Nicola Berti 7
  Andreas Brehme 3
  Andrea Mandorlini 3
  Alessandro Bianchi 3

Coppa Italia 

First round

Second round

Coppa UEFA 

First round

Second round

Round of 16

References

Sources
  RSSSF - Italy 1988/89

Inter Milan seasons
Inter
1989